Roberto de Souza Rocha (born February 2, 1973), also known by the stage name Latino, is a Brazilian recording artist and entertainer. Latino has sold more than four million albums along his career.

Biography
Rocha was born in Rio de Janeiro, Brazil. In 1988 he moved to the United States, where his mother was living with his stepfather. Rocha stayed there for four years, working as barman, magician, cook, dancer and even as waiter. He was also roadie for David Copperfield, and started performing in bars and nightclubs. Being repeatedly referred as a "Latin Boy" at work, Rocha decided to use "Latino" as his stage name.

Going back to Brazil, Latino successfully started his artistic career in 1994, recording his first CD Marcas de Amor. The tracks "Me Leva" and "Só Você" attracted attention owing to their dance rhythm. The album sold over 100 thousand copies and certified gold.

His next album was Aventureiro resulting in singles "Eu Amo Você" and "Louca". In 1997, he ventured into Spanish releasing a Spanish CD version of his album in Mexico. 1998 saw release of "Vitrine", a big radio hit. In 1999, he released Latino 2000 with the resulting single "Solidão é Demais".

At this point, Latino started to get flak in the media for the emptiness of his lyrics, and was shunned by other artists, who made music satirizing him. With the 2000s, Latino started producing some artists and becoming host of TV program Sábado Show on Rede TV. "Tô Nem Aí" (meaning I Don't Care) co-written by Latino and Luka, a Brazilian artist, became a No. 1 hit in Brazil and Portugal, and appeared on European charts in Italy, Germany, Spain and others European countries. He was cover model in G Magazine in July 2000.

Xeque Mate came in 2003. The playlist songs portrayed the biography of his last and enduring relationship. "Você Já Foi Mais Humilde" ("You Used To Be More Humble"), "Cartão Vermelho" ("Red Card") and "Medo Meu" ("My Fear") show that. In 2003, Latino did a cameo appearance in Kubanacan, a Rede Globo television soap opera (Rede Globo (Globe Network) is Brazil's biggest television network and the number one producer and provider of Portuguese language television programming in the world. It is also one of the biggest TV channels in the world, watched by 80 million people daily). In the same year he released his first live CD: Latino Ao Vivo – 10 Anos de Sucessos. It was produced by Up In The Air Produções, distributed by Som Livre (Globo TV Organization record company) and joined all the greatest hits of his career. "Me Leva", "Não Adianta Chorar" ("There's No Use Crying"), "Só Você" and "Eu Amo Você", are some of them.

Although his career can be described as successful, Latino's practice of taking hits from other countries and re-recording them has been met with wide criticism from the musical community in Brazil, mostly because his lyrics have no relation whatsoever to the original music.

On September 17, 2012, Latino posted in his YouTube channel a video containing a Brazilian version of the Korean hit "Gangnam Style" with the name "Despedida de Solteiro (Laçar, Puxar, Beijar)". After it, YouTube had closed their YouTube account, with more than 100,000 "dislikes" on his video and numerous complaints from users, saying that the song was plagiarized and a cheap copy who spoiling the original version.

Sampled and covered songs
Latino sampled Earth, Wind & Fire's song "Let's Groove" in his song "Provoca", he also sampled Backstreet Boys’ song "All I Have To Give" in his song "Solidão É Demais", Evelyn "Champagne" King’s "Shame" in his song "Divinas",and his secondary sample of P.M. Dawn’s "Set Adrift on Memory Bliss" (from original song True by Spandau Ballet) in his song "Carta Canção", from the album Latino 2000. 

His song "Festa no Apê" is a remix of "Dragostea Din Tei", from the Moldavian band O-Zone. The song "Sem Noção" is a remix of "Chacarron" from the singer El Chombo.

Discography

Studio albums 
Marcas de Amor (1994)
Aventureiro (1996)
Latino (1997)
Latino 2000 (1999)
Xeque Mate (2002)
Latino Apresenta as Aventuras do DJ L (2004)
Latino Apresenta as Novas Aventuras de DJ L (2005)
Sem Noção (2007)
Junto e Misturado (2008)
James Bom de Cama (2014)
Soy Latino (2015)

References

External links

1973 births
Living people
Musicians from Rio de Janeiro (city)
20th-century Brazilian male singers
20th-century Brazilian singers
Brazilian pop singers
Funk carioca musicians
21st-century Brazilian male singers
21st-century Brazilian singers